The Revue d'Histoire de la Pharmacie  is a French academic journal founded in  1913. It covers the fields of the History of Medicine and pharmacy. It was previously known as the Bulletin de la Société d'Histoire de la Pharmacie.

External links
 National Library Of Medicine

Publications established in 1913
History of medicine journals
Pharmacology journals
1913 establishments in France